These are lists of all tornadoes that have been confirmed by local offices of the National Weather Service in the United States in 2009.

List of United States tornadoes from January to March 2009
List of United States tornadoes in April 2009
List of United States tornadoes in May 2009
List of United States tornadoes in June 2009
List of United States tornadoes from July to August 2009
List of United States tornadoes from September to October 2009 
List of United States tornadoes from November to December 2009

2009